Strip Tease Murder is a low budget 1961 British film thriller directed by Ernest Morris and starring John Hewer and Ann Lynn.

Plot
Diana, a stripper, is electrocuted during a dance routine on stage at the Flamingo Club. Her husband, compere Bert Black, turns detective to investigate. He suspects Diana was murdered for a crime she didn't commit, but proving it to the satisfaction of Inspector Forbes is another matter.

Cast
John Hewer as Bert
Ann Lynn as Rita
Jean Muir as Diana
Vanda Hudson as Angelin
Kenneth J. Warren as Branco
Carl Duering as Rocco
Michael Peake as Martin
Leon Cortez as Lou
Peter Elliot as Perkel
Trevor Reid as Inspector Forbes
Christine Child, Judy Collins, Janet Hall and Lita Howard as Flamingo dancers
Mitzi Bardot, Vicki Grey, Margo Mitchell and Shari as Flamingo showgirls
Robert Mooney as Mechanic
Robert Crewdson as Andy
Michael Blake as Mike
Walter Horsbrugh as Doctor

Critical reception
Hal Erickson in Allmovie called it a "lurid British potboiler", while in The Spinning Image, Graeme Clarke wrote, "Strip Tease Murder had a title which promised far more lurid thrills than the censorship of the day would have allowed them to deliver on, although as far as the nudity went it was still going further than most of its contemporaries. Yet you could see as much in such higher profile fare as Expresso Bongo, and probably be more entertained by a better standard of production to boot...now appearing whimsically old-fashioned, Strip Tease Murder was unlikely to find an enduring reception outside of vintage exploitation fans."

References

External links

1961 films
British thriller films
1960s thriller films
Films shot at New Elstree Studios
1960s English-language films
Films directed by Ernest Morris
1960s British films